David Morrison (born 1956) is a retired senior officer of the Australian Army.

David Morrison or Dave Morrison may also refer to:

 David Morrison (astrophysicist) (born 1940), American astrophysicist
 David R. Morrison (author) (1941–2012), Scottish author, editor and painter
 David R. Morrison (mathematician) (born 1955), American mathematician
 Dave Morrison (soccer) (born 1957), American soccer player
 Dave Morrison (poet) (born 1959), American writer and poet
 Dave Morrison (runner) (born 1962), American runner
 Dave Morrison (ice hockey) (born 1962), ice hockey player
 Dave Morrison (footballer) (born 1974), English former professional footballer
 David Rush Morrison, American cinematographer